Warren Ferguson may refer to:

 Warren J. Ferguson (1920–2008), American federal judge
 Deputy Warren Ferguson, a fictional character on The Andy Griffith Show